Wim Hofkens (born 27 March 1958) is a former football player who played five games for the Dutch national side.

Hofkens is one of only eight Dutch football players to be selected for the national team while never having played in the Dutch Eredivisie. The others capped players are Jordi Cruyff, Jerrel Hasselbaink, Timothy Fosu-Mensah, Willi Lippens, Rob Reekers, Javairô Dilrosun and Nathan Aké.

Honours

Club
Beveren
 Belgian Pro League : 1978–79
 Belgian Cup: 1977–78
 Belgian Supercup: 1979

RSC Anderlecht

 Belgian First Division: 1980–81, 1984–85
 UEFA Cup: 1982–83 (winners), 1983-84 (runners-up)
 Jules Pappaert Cup: 1983, 1985

KV Mechelen

 Belgian First Division: 1988–89
 Belgian Cup: 1986–87 (winners), 1990-91 (runners-up), 1991-92 (runners-up)
 European Cup Winners Cup: 1987–88 (winners)
 European Super Cup: 1988
 Amsterdam Tournament: 1989
 Joan Gamper Trophy: 1989
 Jules Pappaert Cup: 1990

References

Wim Hofkens at Voetbal International 
Career stats

1958 births
Living people
Dutch footballers
Dutch expatriate footballers
Dutch expatriate sportspeople in Belgium
Netherlands international footballers
Eerste Divisie players
Belgian Pro League players
Willem II (football club) players
K.S.K. Beveren players
R.S.C. Anderlecht players
K. Beerschot V.A.C. players
K.V. Mechelen players
K.V. Kortrijk players
AZ Alkmaar players
Expatriate footballers in Belgium
People from Drimmelen
UEFA Cup winning players
Association football defenders
Association football midfielders
Footballers from North Brabant